Oliver Fortuin is a South African businessman and corporate executive who serves as the Group Chief Executive Officer of SEACOM, since January 2021. Before that, he was the group chief enterprise officer at MTN Group. In his new assignment, he is based at SEACOM's international headquarters in Johannesburg, Gauteng Province, South Africa.

Background and education
Fortuin is a South African national. He holds a Master of Business Administration, obtained from the Open University, in the United Kingdom.

Career
Fortuin has a business career going back over 20 years. He spent several years in various managerial and executive positions at International Business Machines (IBM), responsible for Sub-Saharan Africa in one position  and for the entire African continent in another role.

He also spent three years at BT Global Services, managing their business in Sub-Saharan Africa. He joined MTN Group in 2007, serving there for nearly four years as the Group Chief Enterprise Officer.

At SEACOM, Oliver Fortuin replaced Byron Clatterbuck, who resigned for personal reasons. As Group CEO, Fortuin oversaw the acquisition of 100 percent of Hirani Telecom cable network in Nairobi, Kenya, where Hirani provides last mile connections for SEACOM customers. Also, under his watch, SEACOM acquired the office space and other selected assets in Uganda previously owned by the now defunct Africell Uganda.

Other considerations
Fortuin is a Fellow of the Africa Leadership Initiative–South Africa, being a member of the sixth class. He is also a member of the Aspen Global Leadership Network. In addition, he is a mentor for aspiring business executives in the community where he lives and works.

See also
 Economy of South Africa
 Ralph Mupita

References

External links
 Personal Profile at LinkedIn.com

Living people
Date of birth missing (living people)
South African businesspeople
South African business executives
South African chief executives
Alumni of the Open University
Year of birth missing (living people)